, , or  is a municipality in Troms og Finnmark county, Norway. The administrative centre of the municipality is the village of Olderdalen. Other villages include Løkvollen, Manndalen, Birtavarre, Trollvik, Samuelsberg, Nordmannvik, and Djupvik.

The  municipality is the 116th largest by area out of the 356 municipalities in Norway. Kåfjord is the 278th most populous municipality in Norway with a population of 2,012.

General information
The municipality of Kåfjord was established in 1929 when the large Lyngen Municipality was divided into three: Lyngen in the northwest, Kåfjord in the northeast, and Storfjord Municipality in the south. The initial population of Kåfjord was 2,482. Then on 1 January 1992, the Nordnes area along the Lyngen fjord in Lyngen Municipality (population: 38) was transferred to Kåfjord Municipality.

On 1 January 2020, the municipality became part of the newly formed Troms og Finnmark county. Previously, it had been part of the old Troms county.

Name
The municipality (originally the parish) is named after the local Kåfjorden. The name is likely a Norwegianized form of the Sámi name . The first element of the Sami name has an unknown meaning.

The name of the municipality was simply Kåfjord from 1926 until 2 May 1994 when the name was changed to Gáivuotna–Kåfjord. This new name combined the Sami and Norwegian names into one. It was the fifth municipality in Norway to get a Sami name. In 2005, the name was again changed such that either the Sami name (Gáivuotna) or the Norwegian name (Kåfjord) could be used interchangeably.

In 2016, the name was changed again. This time, the Kven language name was added to the list of official names. All three names are equal and parallel names for the municipality.

Coat of arms
The coat of arms was granted on 20 January 1989. The official blazon is "Gules, a spinning wheel argent". This means the arms have a red field (background) and the charge is a spinning wheel. The spinning wheel has a tincture of argent which means it is commonly colored white, but if it is made out of metal, then silver is used. The spinning wheel was chosen because it is a timeless symbol. Handicrafts have long and particular traditions in Kåfjord. It is also a unifying symbol for Kåfjord's population since many residents (at the time of the adoption of the arms) had had a spinning wheel in their homes while they were growing up. It also is meant as a symbol of frugality, self-sufficiency, and an industrious people. The arms were designed by Arvid Sveen.

Churches
The Church of Norway has one parish within the municipality. It is part of the Nord-Troms prosti (deanery) in the Diocese of Nord-Hålogaland.

History
In 1945, the villages of Kåfjord were burned to the ground during the retreat of German forces from Finland and Finnmark. This was as far west as the Wehrmacht used their scorched earth tactics.

Government
All municipalities in Norway, including Kåfjord, are responsible for primary education (through 10th grade), outpatient health services, senior citizen services, unemployment and other social services, zoning, economic development, and municipal roads. The municipality is governed by a municipal council of elected representatives, which in turn elect a mayor.  The municipality falls under the Nord-Troms District Court and the Hålogaland Court of Appeal.

Municipal council
The municipal council  of Kåfjord is made up of 17 representatives that are elected to four year terms. The party breakdown of the council is as follows:

Mayors
The mayors of Kåfjord:

1930-1942: Anton D. Meedby (LL)
1942-1943: Leif Caroliussen (NS)
1943-1945: Edvard A. Manndal (NS)
1945-1946: Anton D. Meedby (LL)
1946-1959: Anton Antonsen (Ap)
1960-1963: Peder Sandbukt (Ap)
1964-1967: Andor Sandvoll (LL)
1968-1971: Hans Berg (Ap)
1972-1975: Halfdan Hansen (LL)
1976-1977: Peder Sandbukt (LL)
1978-1987: Einar Storslett (LL)
1988-1989: Ansgar Hansen (LL)
1990-1991: Einar Storslett (LL)
1991-1993: Terje Solberg (LL)
1993-1999: Åge B. Pedersen (Ap)
1999-2003: Kristin Vatnelid Johansen (LL)
2003–2015: Bjørn Inge Mo (Ap)
2015-2019: Svein O. Leiros (Sp)
2019–present: Bernt Eirik Isaksen Lyngstad (Ap)

Geography

The municipality is situated on the eastern side of the Lyngen fjord, and around its eastern arm, the Kåfjord. The municipal centre is Olderdalen. Other villages include Birtavarre, Kåfjorddalen, Djupvik, Nordmannvik, and Manndalen, where the international indigenous peoples' festival Riddu Riđđu is hosted each year.

Economy

Fishing and small-scale farming have been the most important sources of income. Now many people work in education and other public services. The population has declined for many years, but the decline is now less rapid than earlier. A new optimism has arisen among young people, largely due to the increasing cultural activities.

Population
The majority of the population is of Sami origin. Due to assimilation pressure from the Norwegian State, the language was largely lost in the 20th century. Efforts are being made to reintroduce the Northern Sami language which is largely concentrated in the municipality's largest village, Manndalen/Olmmáivággi.

Notable people
 Erik Johnsen, (Norwegian Wiki) (1844 in Kåfjord i Lyngen – 1941) a Laestadian preacher, received the King's Medal of Merit in 1938 for his work for the salvation of the soul.
 Rolf Ketil Bjørn (1938 in Kåfjord – 2008) a Norwegian businessperson and politician
 Jan Lindvall (born 1950 in Kåfjord) a Norwegian retired cross-country skier who competed at the 1984 Winter Olympics

Gallery

References

External links

Municipal fact sheet from Statistics Norway 

Municipalities of Troms og Finnmark
Sámi-language municipalities
Populated places of Arctic Norway
 
1929 establishments in Norway